Juliénas is a commune in the department of Rhône, in east-central France.

See also
Juliénas AOC (Beaujolais cru), a wine from the Beaujolais region
Communes of the Rhône department

References

Communes of Rhône (department)
Beaujolais (province)